Samuel Brown may refer to:

 Samuel Brown (Royal Navy officer) (1776–1852), English pioneer suspension bridge engineer and inventor 
 Samuel Brown (engineer) (died 1849), English inventor of early internal combustion engine
 Samuel Brown (Wisconsin politician) (1804–1874), American pioneer and politician in Milwaukee, Wisconsin
 Samuel Robbins Brown (1810–1880), American missionary to China
 Samuel Gilman Brown (1813–1885), American educator
 Samuel Morison Brown (1817–1856), Scottish chemist, poet and essayist 
 Samuel S. Brown (1842–1905), American businessman, racehorse owner/breeder, racetrack owner
 Samuel Brown (mayor) (1845–1909), mayor of Wellington, New Zealand
 Samuel McConnell Brown (1865–1923), Australian politician
 Samuel Brown (Alberta politician) (1872–1962), provincial politician from Alberta, Canada
 Samuel Ashley Brown (1923–2011), English professor at the University of South Carolina
 Samuel Brown (Oregon politician) (1821–1886), American pioneer and politician
 Samuel Lombard Brown (1858–1939), Irish politician and barrister
 Samuel Brown (cricketer) (1857–1938), English cricketer
 Samuel J. Brown (1917–1990), United States Air Forces fighter pilot

See also 
 Samuel Browne (disambiguation)
 Sam Brown (disambiguation)  
 Sam Browne (disambiguation)